Malcolm Stolt (born 30 December 2000) is a Swedish football forward who currently plays for Östersund.

References

2000 births
Living people
Swedish footballers
Association football forwards
IFK Östersund players
Östersunds FK players
Allsvenskan players